KCHA (1580 AM) is an oldies formatted broadcast radio station licensed to Charles City, Iowa, serving Charles City & Floyd County as well as North Central and North Eastern Iowa. KCHA is owned and operated by North Iowa Broadcasting, LLC. It was first licensed on December 13, 1949.

Deadly Tornado
KCHA was noted for its role during the May 15, 1968 tornado that tore through Charles City, destroying over half the town and killing 13 residents and injuring hundreds. One of the largest twisters ever recorded in the state, the storm destroyed much of the downtown – 256 businesses and 1,250 homes. KCHA was warning people of the incoming storm when the tornado struck. After power was knocked out, station personnel installed an emergency generator at the transmitter site on Stony Point Road and was back on the air later that evening.

Transmission Location
The KCHA transmitter is located on Stony Point Road in Charles City, right off Business 218 near K-Mart.

Programming
The station broadcasts an oldies format.

KCHA also produces a special themed weekend on the weekends.

Broadcast Signal
The KCHA signal stretches from Forest City to West Union and Austin, Minnesota south to Waterloo during the day. At night, the signal covers Floyd County, IA.

References

External links
Fabulous 1580 & 103.3 Online

FCC History Cards for KCHA

CHA